
Year 759 (DCCLIX) was a common year starting on Monday (link will display the full calendar) of the Julian calendar. The denomination 759 for this year has been used since the early medieval period, when the Anno Domini calendar era became the prevalent method in Europe for naming years.

Events 
 By place 

 Byzantine Empire 
 Battle of the Rishki Pass: Emperor Constantine V invades Bulgaria again, but his forces are ambushed and defeated while crossing the Rishki Pass, near Stara Planina (modern Bulgaria). The Bulgarian ruler (khagan) Vinekh does not exploit his success, and begins peace negotiations.

 Europe 
 Siege of Narbonne: The Franks under King Pepin III ("the Short") retake Narbonne from the Muslims, after a 7-year siege. He pushes them back across the Pyrenees, and the Muslims retreat to the Andalusian heartland after 40 years of occupation. The government of the city is assigned to the Visigothic count Miló.

 Britain 
 July 24 – King Oswulf of Northumbria is murdered by members of his own household (his servants or bodyguards), at Market Weighton. The Deiran patrician, Æthelwald Moll, who probably conspired in the regicide, is crowned king of Norhumbria. He may have been a descendant of the late king Oswine of Deira.
 Exceptional winter in England. Frost begins October 1, and ends February 26, 760.

 Abbasid Caliphate 
 Caliph al-Mansur of the Abbasid Caliphate launches the conquest of Tabaristan (on the southern coast of the Caspian Sea). Its ruler, Khurshid II, flees into the mountainous region of Daylam.

 Asia 
 An Lushan Rebellion: Tang forces under Guo Ziyi lay siege to the city of Yanjing (Northern China) as they increase their efforts to end the rebellion. The fighting creates such a shortage of food within its walls that rats sell at enormous prices.
 Otomo no Yakamochi, Japanese general, compiles the first Japanese poetry anthology, Man'yōshū. It contains some 500 poems by Japanese poets who include the emperor, noblemen and commoners.
 December 24 – Tang Dynasty poet Du Fu departs for Chengdu, where he is hosted by fellow poet Pei Di.

 By topic 

 Religion 
 The Tōshōdai-ji Buddhist Temple is founded in Nara, Japan.

Births 
 Alfonso II, king of Asturias (d. 842)
 Asad ibn al-Furat, Muslim jurist and theologian (d. 828)
 Gregory of Khandzta, Georgian archimandrite (d. 861)
 Quan Deyu, chancellor of the Tang Dynasty (d. 818)
 Theodore the Studite, Byzantine abbot (d. 826)
 Wang Shizhen, general of the Tang Dynasty (d. 809)
 Wu Yantong, Chinese Buddhist monk (approximate date)

Deaths 
 July 24 – Oswulf, king of Northumbria
 Edburga, Anglo-Saxon abbess
 Dúngal mac Amalgado, king of Brega (Ireland)
 Othmar, Swiss abbot (approximate date)
 Wang Wei, Chinese poet (b. 699)

References